From the Heart of Town is the second album by Gallon Drunk, released in 1993 through Sire Records.

Track listing

Accolades

Chart positions

Personnel 
Gallon Drunk
Joe Byfield – maracas
Max Décharné – drums
Mike Delanian – bass guitar, claves, tambourine, drums, percussion
James Johnston – vocals, guitar, banjo, piano, organ, harmonica, percussion
Production and additional personnel
François Deschamps – engineering
Steve Double – photography
Terry Edwards – saxophone on "Bedlam" and "You Should Be Ashamed", trumpet on "Bedlam"
Jem Noble – engineering
Laetitia Sadier – additional vocals on "You Should Be Ashamed" and "Loving Alone"
Geraldine Swayne – additional vocals on "You Should Be Ashamed" and "Push the Boat Out"
Phil Wright – production, Hammond organ on "Loving Alone"

References

External links 
 

1993 albums
Gallon Drunk albums
Sire Records albums